Cassidulina may refer to:
 Cassidulina (foraminifera), a genus in the family Cassidulinidae
 Cassidulina (echinoderms), a superfamily of sea urchins in the order Cassiduloida